The Stick style was a late-19th-century American architectural style, transitional between the Carpenter Gothic style of the mid-19th century, and the Queen Anne style that it had evolved into by the 1890s. It is named after its use of linear "stickwork" (overlay board strips) on the outside walls to mimic an exposed half-timbered frame.

Characteristics
The style sought to bring a translation of the balloon framing that had risen in popularity during the middle of the century, by alluding to it through plain trim boards, soffits, aprons, and other decorative features. Stick-style architecture is recognizable by the relatively plain layout, often accented with trusses on the gables or decorative shingles.

The stickwork decoration is not structurally significant, being just narrow planks or thin projections applied over the wall's clapboards. The planks intersect mostly at right angles, and sometimes diagonally as well, resembling the half-timbering of medieval – especially Tudor – buildings.

The style was commonly used in houses, train stations, life-saving stations, and other buildings from the era.

The Stick style did have several characteristics in common with the later Queen Anne style: interpenetrating roof planes with bold panelled brick chimneys, the wrap-around porch, spindle detailing, the "panelled" sectioning of blank wall, radiating spindle details at the gable peaks. Highly stylized and decorative versions of the Stick style are often referred to as Eastlake.

Stick–Eastlake
Stick–Eastlake is a style term that uses details from the Eastlake movement, started by Charles Eastlake, of decorative arts on stick-style buildings. It is sometimes referred to as Victorian stick, a variation of stick and Eastlake styles.  Stick–Eastlake enjoyed modest popularity in the late 19th century, but there are relatively few surviving examples of the style when compared to other more popular styles of Victorian architecture.

Gallery

Examples
 Chatham Train Station in Chatham, Massachusetts
 Delaware and Hudson Railroad Passenger Station (Altamont Free Library) in Altamont, New York
 John N. A. Griswold House in Newport, Rhode Island
 Hinds House in Santa Cruz, California
 Orfordville Depot in Orfordville, Wisconsin
 Emlen Physick Estate in  Cape May, New Jersey
 John Reichert Farmhouse in Mequon, Wisconsin
 Swampscott Railroad Depot in Swampscott, Massachusetts
 Herman C. Timm House in New Holstein, Wisconsin
 Hereford Inlet lighthouse in North Wildwood, New Jersey
 Point Fermin Lighthouse in San Pedro in Los Angeles, California
 Ladd Carriage House in Portland, Oregon
 Howland Library (Howland Cultural Center) in Beacon, New York
 William J. Clark House in Branford, Connecticut
 Vollmer House in San Francisco, California

See also
 List of architectural styles

References

Further reading 
 Foster, Gerald L., American houses: a field guide to the architecture of the home, Houghton Mifflin Harcourt, 2004. Cf. p. 387 and various.

External links 
 

 
 
19th-century architecture in the United States
Stick-Eastlake
Stick-Eastlake
 Stick-Eastlake
Stick-Eastlake
Stick-Eastlake
Wooden buildings and structures in the United States